Charles Thomas Walker Traditional Magnet School (C.T. Walker) is a public examination school located in the Laney-Walker district of Augusta, Georgia, United States. It draws students from kindergarten through eighth grade from all parts of the Richmond County School System. It is one of four  magnet schools in Richmond County.

History
The school's history dates back to 1934, when it housed grades 1-7. The building was constructed with federal assistance and opened with an enrollment of 1500 students (500 over the building's specifications). When Richmond County schools were integrated in the 1970s, the enrollment of the school  decreased to about 500 students. Court-ordered busing was instituted to ensure racial balances in student population and to remedy fluctuating enrollment patterns.

In 1980 it became a magnet school, housing grades K-5. Like in other magnet schools in the county, racial quotas maintained a racially balanced student body (45% African American, 45% Caucasian, 10% other). The concept brought changes in structural organization. During its first year as a magnet school, C.T. Walker housed 400 K-5 students admitted on the basis of a lottery that was conducted by community leaders and school officials. Beginning with the 1981 school year, the sixth grade was added to the school structure, followed by the seventh grade in 1982, and the eighth grade in 1983. In 1999, the C. T. Walker Magnet School celebrated its twentieth anniversary as a magnet school.

Awards and recognition
 Georgia School of Excellence — 2003
 Recognition as being a "no excuses" school with a 62% percent poverty rate, which is 50% above the state average; statistic published and placed on Georgia's State Report Card for Parents

See also

 Richmond County School System

References

External links
 Official website
 Charles T. Walker — The Augusta Chronicle

Educational institutions established in 1934
Magnet schools in Richmond County, Georgia
Elementary schools in Richmond County, Georgia
Middle schools in Richmond County, Georgia
Schools accredited by the Southern Association of Colleges and Schools
Magnet schools in Georgia (U.S. state)
Public middle schools in Georgia (U.S. state)
Public elementary schools in Georgia (U.S. state)
1934 establishments in Georgia (U.S. state)